Chandata partita is a moth of the family Noctuidae first described by Frederic Moore in 1882. It is found in India.

References

Hadeninae
Moths of Asia
Moths described in 1882